Northern Illinois University (NIU) is a public research university in DeKalb, Illinois. It was founded as Northern Illinois State Normal School on May 22, 1895, by Illinois Governor John P. Altgeld as part of an expansion of the state's system for producing college-educated teachers.  In addition to the main campus in DeKalb, it has satellite centers in Chicago, Naperville, Rockford, and Oregon, Illinois.

The university is composed of seven degree-granting colleges and has a student body of approximately 16,000 with over 240,000 alumni. NIU is one of only two public universities in Illinois that compete in the National Collegiate Athletic Association at the highest levels of all sports, Division I. The university's athletic teams are known as the Huskies and compete in the Mid-American Conference (MAC).

History

Northern Illinois University was founded as part of the expansion of the normal school program established in 1857 in Normal, Illinois. In 1895, the state legislature created a board of trustees for the governance of the Northern Illinois State Normal School, which would grow into what is today known as NIU.

In July 1917, the Illinois Senate consolidated the boards of trustees for the five state normal schools (Eastern Illinois State Normal School, Illinois State Normal School, Northern Illinois State Normal School, Southern Illinois State Normal University, and Western Illinois State Normal School) into one state Normal School Board.

Over the next fifty-eight years, the school and the governing board changed their names several times. In 1921, the legislature gave the institution the name Northern Illinois State Teachers College and empowered it to award the four-year Bachelor of Education degree. In 1941, the Normal School Board changed its name to the Teachers College Board. In 1951 the Teachers College Board authorized the college to grant the degree Master of Science in Education, and the institution's Graduate School was established. On July 1, 1955, the state legislature renamed the college Northern Illinois State College and authorized the college to broaden its educational services by offering academic work in areas other than teacher education. The Teachers College Board granted permission for the college to add curricula leading to the degrees Bachelor of Arts and Bachelor of Science. On July 1, 1957, the Seventieth General Assembly renamed Northern Illinois State College as Northern Illinois University in recognition of its expanded status as a liberal arts university.

In 1965, the Illinois State Teachers College Board became the Board of Governors of State Colleges and Universities and was reorganized to include Northeastern University, Governor's State, and Chicago State Universities. In 1967 authority for Northern Illinois University, Illinois State University, and Sangamon State University were passed on to a newly formed board of regents. In 1984, the board created the position of chancellor for the three regent universities to act as a chief executive for all three schools; the first person appointed chancellor was then-NIU President William R. Monat. The board of regents and the chancellor governed the three regency universities until the end of 1995. On January 1, 1996, authority for each of the three regency universities was transferred to three independent boards of trustees, each concerned solely with one university.

On February 14, 2008, the university drew international attention when a gunman opened fire in a crowd of students on campus, killing five students and injuring 17 more people, before fatally shooting himself.

University presidents
13 presidents have served at the university.

 John Williston Cook (1899–1919)
 J. Stanley Brown (1919–1927)
 Joseph Clifton Brown (1927–1929)
 Karl L. Adams (1929–1948)
 Leslie A. Holmes (1949–1967)
 Rhoten A. Smith (1967–1971)
 Richard J. Nelson (1971–1978)
 William R. Monat (1978–1984)
 Clyde Wingfield (1985–1986)
 John E. La Tourette (1986–2000)
 John G. Peters (2000–2013)
 Douglas D. Baker (2013–2017)
 Lisa C. Freeman (2017–present)

Academics

NIU has seven degree-granting colleges that together offer more than 60 undergraduate majors, 70 minors, nine pre-professional programs, and 79 graduate programs, including a College of Law, and 24 areas of study leading to doctoral degrees. Many of NIU's academic programs are nationally accredited for meeting the highest standards of academic quality and rigor, including business, engineering, nursing, visual and performing arts, and all teacher certification programs. New interdisciplinary academic programs in Environmental Studies and Community Leadership and Civic Engagement were established in FY 2012.

Rankings

In 2021, Northern Illinois University was ranked the 97th top college in the United States by Payscale and CollegeNet's Social Mobility Index college rankings. NIU is classified as a "National University" by U.S. News & World Report and ranked number 177 out of 206 ranked National Universities (75 National Universities were left unranked). The same publication also ranked NIU as 41st best in the country for Public Affairs programs, and within that field, NIU's program in City Management & Urban Policy was ranked 3rd in the nation and the Public Finance & Budgeting program at 12th. Forbes magazine placed NIU as number 386 on its list of 600 universities in 2021.

Science and research

NIU is classified among "R2: Doctoral Universities – High research activity". The university is also a member of the Universities Research Association that manages several federal physics laboratories including Fermi National Accelerator Laboratory in Batavia, Illinois. The university is expanding its program in accelerator technology.

Established in 1963, Northern Illinois University's Center for Southeast Asian Studies (CSEAS) is currently one of seven federally recognized National Resource Centers (NRC) for Southeast Asian foreign language and area studies. NIU has been awarded the Title VI Foreign Language and Area Studies (FLAS) Fellowships since 1974 and Undergraduate NRC grants since 1997. NIU's CSEAS operates within the College of Liberal Arts and Sciences and offers an undergraduate minor and a graduate concentration in Southeast Asian studies, enrolling more than 1,500 students each year.

Campus
The main campus sits on 756 acres in DeKalb and includes 64 major buildings. Additional campus sites include, the Lorado Taft Field Campus (144 acres), Rockford Campus (10 acres), and the Naperville Campus (11.2 acres).

One of the most prominent buildings on campus is the castle-like Altgeld Hall. It is one of the five castle-themed buildings built according to the suggestion of Governor John Peter Altgeld. The auditorium in Altgeld Hall, which was designed to also function as a ballroom, was restored and can seat up to 500. On the level below the auditorium, the original gym was transformed into a computer classroom. Also on the same level is the NIU Art Museum which occupies two large spaces. 

The East Lagoon near Altgeld is a spot on campus.
Barsema Hall, which houses the College of Business, opened its doors in 2002. This 144,000 square-foot facility houses modern classrooms, faculty offices, several computer labs, a large atrium at the center of the building as well as a 375-seat auditorium.

The Holmes Student Center houses several lounges, computer labs, restaurants, and the University Bookstore. It is home to the Huskies Den, which features bowling, billiards, a video arcade and PlayStation 4 and Xbox One gaming. The Holmes Student Center also houses a 78-room hotel. The lower level of the Holmes Student Center reopened after renovations were completed in January 2020. The renovations include a convenience store, the University Bookstore, a Starbucks, the Huskie Den Grill, bowling & billiards, and a wealth of seating.

Residence halls
NIU's residence halls (including two complexes with four 12-story towers each) provide several living options to on-campus students. Living-learning floors include the Health Professions House; Business Careers House; Teacher Education and Certification House (TEACH); Honors House; International House; Science, Technology, Engineering & Mathematics (STEM) House; and Fine Arts House. Other floor options include all-men, all-women, transfers, quiet lifestyle and alcohol-free.

Northern View Community, which opened in 2008, offers apartments to undergraduate students who are at least two years post-high school, graduate students, law students, or any student who has a dependent and/or a partner or spouse.

The New Residence Hall, a 1,000-bed complex just north of Lincoln Hall, opened to all students in the fall of 2012. It features two residential buildings where students can live in clusters of 12.

After an extensive renovation, Grant C Tower reopened in the fall of 2011 with completely new accommodations and furnishings for NIU students. Gilbert Hall, which had not been used as a residence hall since 1995, underwent a complete renovation and re-opened in the fall of 2013. Grant D Tower was renovated and re-opened in the fall of 2013.

Douglas Hall, a part of the pair of residence halls Lincoln-Douglas, was demolished by the spring of 2016. Lucinda Avenue has been extended and used since the spring of 2016. This is a part of the master plan to create a new campus.

Residence halls in use:
 Gilbert Hall
 Grant Towers
 Neptune Hall
 New Residence Hall
 Northern View
 Stevenson Towers

Athletic facilities
On the west side of campus is Brigham Field at Huskie Stadium, the home of NIU football games, which also often hosts other outdoor events. Huskie Stadium, which has a seating capacity over 30,000, is surrounded by large open grassy areas which provide recreation, and also serve as the tailgating lots for football games. There is also a baseball field, Ralph McKinzie Field; a softball field, Mary M. Bell Field; a soccer field, Huskie Soccer Complex; and tennis courts, Gullikson Tennis Courts, which flank Huskie Stadium.

At the stadium's north end zone are two athletic buildings. The first is the $14-million Jeffrey and Kimberly Yordon Academic and Athletic Performance Center, whose namesakes donated $2.5 million in the fall of 2006 to help with the construction. The facility opened in August 2007. The second is the Kenneth and Ellen Chessick Indoor Practice Center, an 80,600-square-foot practice facility that houses the football, baseball, and softball teams. Ground was broken for the building in November 2012 and it was completed in October 2013.

The Student Recreation Center is the main facility for Recreation Services. The building, serving approximately 2,000 patrons daily, features services to meet students' recreation, fitness and wellness needs.

The residence halls, located in the same area as the athletic facilities, are also flanked by numerous sand volleyball areas, a large quad between the dorms, basketball courts, skating courts, Eco Lake, and open fields for recreation.

On the far west side of campus is the Convocation Center, a 10,000 seat arena opened in 2002. The Convocation Center hosts NIU men's and women's basketball, gymnastics, wrestling, and volleyball, Victor E. Court, games, the opening convocation ceremony for incoming freshmen, music concerts, and a variety of events throughout the year including job fairs, internship fairs, and other expositions.

At the corner of Annie Glidden Road and Lucinda Avenue is the Chick Evans Field House, home to two large activity rooms with mirrors often used by dance clubs; a three-lane, 1/7-mile jogging and walking track; four multipurpose courts for basketball, volleyball, indoor soccer and floor hockey; and a cardio- and strength-training room, which has been under-used since the basketball team moved to the Convocation Center. The field house continues to host expositions and sporting events of a smaller scale, and is the headquarters for the campus ROTC program.

Two swimming pools are located in Anderson and Gabel Halls.

Student life

Programs
NIU's Division of Student Affairs and Enrollment Management hosts numerous programs to enhance students' learning and living experience on campus.

The Orientation and First Year Programs office (OFP) hosts UNIV 101 (University Experience) and UNIV 201 (The Transfer Experience), which provide an introduction to college. These elective 1-credit, 12-week courses are designed to help new students adjust to NIU and develop the skills necessary to succeed in college and beyond. During the fall of 2009, more than 62 percent of the freshman class enrolled in a UNIV 101 course.

A new Academic Advising Center works with "undecided" students from the time they arrive on campus during orientation until they select a major. The student-centered staff advises students as they develop specialized academic plans compatible with student educational and life goals.

Resource centers serve African-American, Asian-American and Latino students as well as off-campus and non-traditional students, military veterans, lesbian, bisexual, gay and transgender students.

Among the many services of the office of Student Involvement & Leadership Development are opportunities for local and far-reaching volunteerism, including NIU Cares Day, Rake Across DeKalb and alternative spring break programs.

The Counseling & Student Development Center supports the academic, emotional, social and cultural development of students through counseling, assessment, crisis response, outreach, consultation, training and educational services.

Health Enhancement provides health promotion information, materials and interventions. The staff includes four health educators and a health consultant.

The Huskie Bus Line, the largest student-run university bus system in Illinois, operates seven days a week while school is in session during the fall and spring semesters. On the weekends it runs a different route. There is a system that allows one to track the location of Huskie Buses online in real-time.

Facilities
NIU's Campus Child Care Center offers care to children aged two months to five years, along with a summer school program for children ages 6 to 8. Enrollment is secured on a first-come, first-served basis, with priority given first to currently enrolled families, followed by NIU students, NIU faculty and staff, and the community. The center is licensed through the State of Illinois and accredited through the Academy of Early Childhood Program Accreditation.

The Campus Life Building is home to the Campus Activities Board, Career Services, the Counseling and Student Development Center, the Honors Program, the Northern Star student newspaper, the Student Association, and Student Involvement and Leadership Development.

Organizations
NIU has more than 400 student organizations, including recreational sports clubs such as lacrosse, volleyball, rugby, swimming, and ice hockey. Groups embrace interests from academics, advocacy, athletics and the arts to community service, ethnicity, politics, language studies, and religion.

Panhellenic Council sororities include Alpha Delta Pi, Alpha Phi, Alpha Sigma Alpha, Delta Gamma, Delta Zeta, Sigma Kappa, Sigma Lambda Sigma, Lambda Theta Alpha, Sigma Lambda Gamma, and Sigma Sigma Sigma.

National Pan-Hellenic Council fraternities and sororities include Alpha Kappa Alpha, Alpha Phi Alpha, Delta Sigma Theta, Iota Phi Theta, Kappa Alpha Psi, Omega Psi Phi, Phi Beta Sigma, Sigma Gamma Rho, and Zeta Phi Beta.

Interfraternity Council fraternities include Alpha Epsilon Pi, Alpha Kappa Lambda, Alpha Sigma Phi, Delta Chi, Delta Upsilon, Phi Kappa Psi, Phi Kappa Sigma, Phi Kappa Theta, Phi Sigma Kappa, Omega Delta, Pi Kappa Phi, Sigma Alpha Epsilon, Sigma Alpha Mu, Sigma Nu, and Tau Kappa Epsilon.

United Greek Council fraternities and sororities include alpha Kappa Delta Phi, Alpha Phi Gamma, Alpha Psi Lambda, Alpha Sigma Omega, Chi Sigma Tau, Gamma Phi Omega, Kappa Delta Chi, Kappa Pi Beta, Kappa Phi Lambda, Lambda Upsilon Lambda, Lambda Theta Phi, Phi Rho Eta, Sigma Lambda Beta, and Tau Phi Sigma.

Each year, several of the Greek organizations at NIU host IFC Tugs, a bracket-style athletic tournament competition similar to tug-of-war with a long history at Northern Illinois University. NIU Tugs was captured on film in a 1996 documentary, Tugs Untied, about NIU's unique version of the sport; the 37-minute documentary won the "Best of Arizona" award at the 2000 Arizona International Film Festival.

Arts and culture

Students and faculty in NIU's College of Visual and Performing Arts host art exhibitions, musical concerts' and theatrical and dance productions throughout the year. Many are free.

The NIU Anthropology Museum was opened to the public on February 12, 2012 in Cole Hall. The Anthropology collections are extensive, with foci on North American native collections and cultural artifacts from throughout Southeast Asia.

NIU's School of Music is home to the NIU Jazz Ensemble, the NIU Steelband, and the Avalon String Quartet.

The NIU Art Museum, which has several galleries in Altgeld Hall, hosts several shows of professional works. The campus also houses the Blackwell History of Education Museum, the Burma Art Collection and the theater-based Historic Scenic Collection.

The Department of Communication sponsors the annual Reality Bytes Film Festival, created in 2002 by media studies professor Laura Vazquez to give NIU students the ability to competitively screen their work. The 2011 festival received more than 40 entries from across the country and as far away as Cuba, South Africa and Australia.

Since 2000 the Visual Communication program in the School of Art and Design has hosted the annual SEEK Design Conference, led by professor Steve Quinn. Students assist in coordinating this conference of about 200 attendees. SEEK has featured designers such as Stefan Sagmeister, Paula Scher, Massimo Vignelli, Chip Kidd, Rick Valicenti, Kyle Cooper, Debbie Millman, Eddie Opara, and Aaron Draplin.

Athletics

Affiliation
NIU was a member of the Illinois Intercollegiate Athletic Conference from 1920 to 1967. Currently, the NIU Huskies compete in NCAA Division I, FBS (I-A) for Football, in the Mid-American Conference.

NIU's athletic department experienced large growth in reputation in the late 1990s and early 2000s. Almost completely unknown to observers from outside of Illinois before the mid-1990s, the Huskies were ranked as high as 10th in the 2003 AP College Football poll after victories against BCS opponents number 14 Maryland (who finished that season at number 17), number 21 Alabama and Iowa State. In 2010, NIU football had its first undefeated MAC regular season (8-0), and cracked the top 25 in Associated Press and coaches' polls. In 2012, NIU football, after winning another MAC Football Championship earned a place in the Orange Bowl and was the first team to participate in a BCS Bowl from the Mid-American Conference.

Notable alumni

See also
Northern Illinois University Press
Northern Illinois University shooting

Notes

References

External links

 
 Northern Illinois Athletics website

 
State universities in Illinois
Public universities and colleges in Illinois
Universities and colleges in DuPage County, Illinois
1895 establishments in Illinois
Educational institutions established in 1895
Education in Rockford, Illinois
Oregon, Illinois
Universities and colleges in Cook County, Illinois
Education in Winnebago County, Illinois
Education in Ogle County, Illinois
Education in DeKalb County, Illinois
DeKalb, Illinois
Education in Naperville, Illinois
Tourist attractions in DeKalb County, Illinois
Buildings and structures in DeKalb County, Illinois
Collegiate Gothic architecture in Illinois